Dreiflüssestadion (Three Rivers Stadium) is a multi-use stadium in Passau, Germany.  It is currently used mostly for football matches and is the home stadium of 1. FC Passau.  The stadium has a capacity of 20,000 people and was built in 1972. For the 1972 Summer Olympics in nearby Munich, it hosted six football matches.

References
1972 Summer Olympics official report. Volume 1. Part 1. p. 121.
1972 Summer Olympics official report. Volume 3. p. 389.
Stadium profile. 
Worldstadiums.com profile

Football venues in Germany
Venues of the 1972 Summer Olympics
Olympic football venues
Buildings and structures in Passau
Sports venues in Bavaria
Sports venues completed in 1969